The 48th Cannes Film Festival was held from 17 to 28 May 1995. The Palme d'Or went to Underground by Emir Kusturica.

The festival opened with La Cité des enfants perdus, directed by Jean-Pierre Jeunet and closed with The Quick and the Dead, directed by Sam Raimi. Carole Bouquet was the mistress of ceremonies.

Juries

Main competition
The following people were appointed as the Jury for the feature films of the 1995 Official Selection:
Jeanne Moreau (France) Jury President
Gianni Amelio (Italy)
Jean-Claude Brialy (France)
Nadine Gordimer (South Africa)
Gaston Kabore (Burkina Faso)
Michele Ray-Gavras (France)
Emilio Garcia Riera (Mexico)
Philippe Rousselot (France)
John Waters (USA)
Mariya Zvereva (Russia)

Camera d'Or
The following people were appointed as the Jury of the 1995 Camera d'Or:
Michel Deville (Director) (France) President
Alberto Barbera (director of the Musée du Cinéma) (Italy)
Caroline Million-Rousseau (Cinephile) (France)
Didier Beaudet (France)
Istvan Gaal (Director) (Hungary)
Michel Demopoulos (Critic)
N.T. Binh (Distributor)

Official selection

In competition - Feature film
The following feature films competed for the Palme d'Or:

 Angels & Insects by Philip Haas
 Between the Devil and the Deep Blue Sea by Marion Hänsel
 Beyond Rangoon by John Boorman
 Carrington by Christopher Hampton
 The City of Lost Children by Marc Caro, Jean-Pierre Jeunet
 The Convent by Manoel de Oliveira
 Dead Man by Jim Jarmusch
 Don't Forget You're Going to Die by Xavier Beauvois
 Ed Wood by Tim Burton
 Good Men, Good Women by Hou Hsiao-hsien
 Historias del Kronen by Montxo Armendáriz
 Jefferson in Paris by James Ivory
 Kids by Larry Clark
 L'amore molesto by Mario Martone
 La Haine by Mathieu Kassovitz
 Land and Freedom by Ken Loach
 The Madness of King George by Nicholas Hytner
 The Neon Bible by Terence Davies
 Shanghai Triad by Zhang Yimou
 Sharaku by Masahiro Shinoda
 The Snails' Senator by Mircea Daneliuc
 Ulysses' Gaze by Theodoros Angelopoulos
 Underground by Emir Kusturica
 Waati by Souleymane Cissé

Un Certain Regard
The following films were selected for the competition of Un Certain Regard:

 A részleg by Péter Gothár
 Augustin by Anne Fontaine
 Bye-Bye by Karim Dridi
 Canadian Bacon by Michael Moore
 Etz Hadomim Tafus by Eli Cohen
 Ren yue huang hun by Yi Fei Chen
 Georgia by Ulu Grosbard
 Haramuya by Drissa Toure
 Indradhanura Chhai by Sushant Misra
 L'aube à l'envers by Sophie Marceau
 Le plus bel âge... by Didier Haudepin
 Lessons in the Language of Love by Scott Patterson
 Lev s sedoy borodoy by Andrey Khrzhanovskiy
 Lisbon Story by Wim Wenders
 Muzyka dlya dekabrya by Ivan Dykhovichny
 Nobat e Asheghi by Mohsen Makhmalbaf
 Kaki bakar by U-Wei Haji Saari
 Rude by Clement Virgo
 Salam Cinema by Mohsen Makhmalbaf
 Tempo di Viaggio by Tonino Guerra, Andrei Tarkovsky
 The Englishman Who Went Up a Hill But Came Down a Mountain by Christopher Monger
 The Monkey Kid by Xiao-Yen Wang
 The Poison Tasters by Ulrik Theer
 Things to Do in Denver When You're Dead by Gary Fleder
 Two Nudes Bathing by John Boorman
 Unstrung Heroes by Diane Keaton

Films out of competition
The following films were selected to be screened out of competition:

 Desperado by Robert Rodriguez
 Kiss of Death by Barbet Schroeder
 The Quick and the Dead by Sam Raimi
 To Die For by Gus Van Sant
 The Usual Suspects by Bryan Singer

Short film competition
The following short films competed for the Short Film Palme d'Or:

 A Hamok Dala by Ferenc Cako
 Despondent Divorcee by Jonathan Ogilvie
 Domo by Maurizio Forestieri
 Gagarine by Alexij Kharitidi
 Cocoon (Koza) by Nuri Bilge Ceylan
 Les Enfants s'ennuient le Dimanche by Sophie Perez, Matthieu Poirot-Delpech
 Sortie de Bain by Florence Henrard
 Swinger by Gregor Jordan
 The Beast by Rhoderyc C. Montgomery
 The Pan Loaf by Sean Hinds

Parallel sections

International Critics' Week
The following films were screened for the 34th International Critics' Week (34e Semaine de la Critique):

Feature film competition

 Manneken Pis by Frank Van Passel (Belgium)
 Soul Survivor by Stephen Williams (Canada)
 The Daughter-in-law (A ba de qing ren) by Steve Wang Hsieh-Chih (Taiwan)
 Mute Witness by Anthony Waller (Germany)
 Denise Calls Up by Hal Salwen (United States)
 Madagascar skin by Chris Newby (United Kingdom)
 Los hijos del viento by Fernando Merinero (Spain)

Short film competition

 An Evil Town by Richard Sears (United States)
 Movements of the Body by Wayne Traudt (Canada)
 Ubu by Manuel Gomez (France, Belgium)
 The Last Laugh by Robert Harders (United States)
 Adios, toby, adios by Ramón Barea (Spain)
 Surprise! by Veit Helmer (Germany)
 Le Pendule by Madame Foucault by Jean-Marc Vervoort (Belgium)

Directors' Fortnight
The following films were screened for the 1995 Directors' Fortnight (Quinzaine des Réalizateurs):

 3 Steps To Heaven by Constantine Giannaris
 An Awfully Big Adventure by Mike Newell
 The White Balloon (Badkonake sefid) by Jafar Panahi
 Café Society by Raymond DeFelitta
 Der Kopf des Mohren by Paulus Manker
 Eggs by Bent Hamer
 Eldorado by Charles Binamé
 Faute de soleil by Christophe Blanc
 Heartbreak Island by Hsu Hsiao-Ming
 Heavy by James Mangold
 The Tale of the Three Lost Jewels (Hikayatul jawahiri thalath) by Michel Khleifi
 L’Enfant noir by Laurent Chevallier
 The Confessional (Le confessionnal) by Robert Lepage
 Le Rocher d'Acapulco by Laurent Tuel
 Nella mischia by Gianni Zanasi
 Pather Panchali by Satyajit Ray
 Revivre by Jean-Luc Raynaud
 Safe by Todd Haynes
 Someone Else's America (Tuđa Amerika) by Goran Paskaljevic
 Sommaren by Kristian Petri
 Visiblement je vous aime by Jean-Michel Carré

Short films

 Le Bus by Jean-Luc Gaget
 Corps inflammables by Jacques Maillot
 Rebonds by Marine Place
 La Vie à Rebours by Gaël Morel
 Une visite by Philippe Harel

Awards

Official awards
The following films and people received the 1995 Official selection awards:
Palme d'Or: Underground by Emir Kusturica
Grand Prize of the Jury: Ulysses' Gaze (To Vlemma tou Odyssea) by Theodoros Angelopoulos 
Best Director: Mathieu Kassovitz for La Haine
Best Actress: Helen Mirren for The Madness of King George
Best Actor: Jonathan Pryce for Carrington
Jury Prize: Don't Forget You're Going to Die by Xavier Beauvois
Jury Special Prize: Carrington by Christopher Hampton
Golden Camera
Caméra d'Or: Badkonake sefid by Jafar Panahi
Golden Camera - Special Mention: Denise Calls Up by Hal Salwen
Short films
Short Film Palme d'Or: Gagarin by Alexij Kharitidi
 Jury Prize: Swinger by Gregor Jordan

Independent awards
FIPRESCI Prizes
Land and Freedom by Ken Loach (In competition)
Ulysses' Gaze (To Vlemma tou Odyssea) by Theodoros Angelopoulos (In competition)
Commission Supérieure Technique
 Technical Grand Prize: Lü Yue (cinematography) in Shanghai Triad (Yáo a yáo, yáo dào wàipó qiáo) by Zhang Yimou
Ecumenical Jury
 Prize of the Ecumenical Jury: Land and Freedom - Ken Loach
 Ecumenical Jury - Special Mention: Between the Devil and the Deep Blue Sea - Marion Hänsel
Award of the Youth
Foreign Film: Manneken Pis by Frank Van Passel
French Film: Bye-Bye by Karim Dridi
Awards in the frame of International Critics' Week
Mercedes-Benz Award: Manneken Pis by Frank Van Passel
Canal+ Award: An Evil Town by Richard Sears
Grand Golden Rail: Manneken Pis by Frank Van Passel
Special Award
 Miracle in Bosnia by Dino Mustafić

References

Media
INA: Opening of the 1995 Festival (commentary in French)
INA: List of winners of the 1995 Festival (commentary in French)

External links

1995 Cannes Film Festival (web.archive)
Official website Retrospective 1995 
Cannes Film Festival:1995  at Internet Movie Database

Cannes Film Festival, 1995
Cannes Film Festival, 1995
Cannes Film Festival
Cannes Film Festival
Cannes